The John Muir National Historic Site is located in the San Francisco Bay Area, in Martinez, Contra Costa County, California. It preserves the 14-room Italianate Victorian mansion where the naturalist and writer John Muir lived, as well as a nearby  325-acre (132 ha) tract of native oak woodlands and grasslands historically owned by the Muir family. The main site is on the edge of town, in the shadow of State Route 4, also known as the "John Muir Parkway."

History

Mansion

The mansion was built in 1883 by Dr. John Strentzel, Muir's father-in-law, with whom Muir went into partnership, managing his  fruit ranch. Muir and his wife, Louisa, moved into the house in 1890, and he lived there until his death in 1914.

Alhambra Trestle

In 1897, for the sum of $10, Muir and Louisa ceded a right of way to the San Francisco and San Joaquin Valley Railroad.  The document describes the land upon which the Alhambra Trestle is located.  The railway was completed in 1900 and used by the Muirs to ship their fruit.

Preservationist

While living here, Muir realized many of his greatest accomplishments, co-founding and serving as the first president of the Sierra Club, in the wake of his battle to prevent Yosemite National Park's Hetch Hetchy Valley from being dammed, playing a prominent role in the creation of several national parks, writing hundreds of newspaper and magazine articles and several books expounding on the virtues of conservation and the natural world, and laying the foundations for the creation of the National Park Service in 1916.

The home contains Muir's "scribble den," as he called his study, and his original desk, where he wrote about many of the ideas that are the bedrock of the modern conservation movement.

Archive and Landmark

The Muir house was documented by the Historic American Buildings Survey in 1960.

It became a National Historic Site in 1964, is California Historical Landmark #312 and a National Historic Landmark, and is on the National Register of Historic Places.

In 1988 nearby Mount Wanda Nature Preserve (named for one of John Muir's two daughters) was added to the Historic Site.

John Muir National Historic Site

The John Muir National Historic Site offers a biographical film, tours of the house and nature walks on Mount Wanda.

Gallery

See also
National Register of Historic Places listings in Contra Costa County, California
History of the Yosemite area

References

External links

National Park Service Discover Our Shared Heritage Travel Itinerary: "Early History of the California Coast"
John Muir Association

H
Muir
Martinez, California
Muir
Muir
Muir, John National Historic Site
Muir
Muir
Houses completed in 1883
Muir
Muir
Muir
Muir
Bay Area Ridge Trail
Muir
1883 establishments in California
Protected areas established in 1962
Muir
Muir
Muir
Muir
Muir
National Historic Landmarks in California